Re Brightlife Ltd [1987] 1 Ch 200 is a UK insolvency law case, concerning the conversion of a floating charge into a fixed charge ("crystallisation"). It held that an automatic crystallisation clause was part of the parties’ freedom of contract. It could not be limited by court created public policy exceptions. The significance of the case was largely outpaced by the Insolvency Act 1986 section 251, which said a floating charge was one that was created as a floating charge.

Facts
Brightlife Ltd had a charge over book debts in favour of Norandex, its bank. The charge said it was a "first specific charge" and did not allow Brightlife to sell, factor or discount debts without written consent. A debenture holder gave the company a notice converting the floating charge into a fixed charge a week before a voluntary winding up resolution was passed. Counsel argued public policy required restriction on crystallising events, one reason being that an automatic crystallisation clause could take effect without knowledge of company or debenture holder. It could be prejudicial to a third party, because it does not get registered. Counsel referred to the Canadian case R v Consolidated Churchill Copper Corp Ltd, where Berger J rejected the concept of a "self generating crystallisation".

Judgment

Hoffmann J held that in reality, the charge on book debts was a floating charge, but had crystallised a week before, and so took priority over other debts. Following Re Manurewa Transport Ltd crystallisation clauses were a necessary incident of parties’ freedom to contract and policy objections should be dealt with by Parliament. He noted various statutory already, including priority to preferential debts. And certainly he at first instance was not going to add to the list. It followed that there was a floating charge if a company can continue to use book debts without the consent of the chargee. He added that although clause 3(A)(ii)(a) referred to a ‘first specific charge’ over book debts and others, ‘the rights over the debts created by the debenture were in my judgment such as to be categorised in law as a floating charge.'

Authority

See also
UK insolvency law

Notes

References

United Kingdom insolvency case law